Keely Kelleher (born August 12, 1984) is an American alpine skier who has competed since 2000. Her best World Cup finish was 20th at a super giant slalom event in Canada in 2009.

Kelleher was named to the US team for the 2010 Winter Olympics in late 2009.

External links
 
 
 

1984 births
Alpine skiers at the 2010 Winter Olympics
American female alpine skiers
Living people
Olympic alpine skiers of the United States
Place of birth missing (living people)
21st-century American women